In graph theory, a graph product is a binary operation on graphs.

The graph products differ in what exactly this condition is.

The terminology and notation for specific graph products in the literature varies quite a lot; even if the following may be considered somewhat standard, readers are advised to check what definition a particular author uses for a graph product, especially in older texts.

Overview table 
The following table shows the most common graph products, with  denoting "is connected by an edge to", and  denoting non-connection.  The operator symbols listed here are by no means standard, especially in older papers.

Mnemonic

Let  be the complete graph on two vertices (i.e. a single edge). The  notation for lexicographic product serves as a reminder that this product is not commutative.

See also
 Graph operations

Notes

References